Jan Lipavský (born 2 July 1985) is a Czech politician and IT manager, who has served as Minister of Foreign Affairs of the Czech Republic since December 2021, in the Cabinet of Petr Fiala. A member of the Czech Pirate Party, he was previously a member of the Chamber of Deputies from October 2017 to October 2021.

Early life
Lipavský was born in Prague on 2 July 1985. He majored in international area studies at the Faculty of Social Sciences, Charles University in Prague, graduating with a Bachelor's degree. He joined the Erasmus Programme for two semesters at the University of Kent, United Kingdom.

Political career

Lipavský served as a member of the Chamber of Deputies from 2017 to 2021. Following the 2021 Czech legislative election, he was appointed Minister of Foreign Affairs in Petr Fiala's Cabinet. President Miloš Zeman expressed his opposition to the appointment of Lipavský as foreign minister.

Honours 
 30 August 2022 - Order of Merit from Ukrainian President Volodymyr Zelensky for supporting Ukraine

References

External links 
 
 Jan Lipavský on Czech Pirate Party website

1985 births
21st-century Czech politicians
Czech Pirate Party MPs
Living people
Charles University alumni
Members of the Chamber of Deputies of the Czech Republic (2017–2021)
Foreign Ministers of the Czech Republic
Politicians from Prague
Czech Pirate Party Government Ministers
Recipients of the Order of Merit (Ukraine), 1st class